D. C. Moore (April 6, 1914 – July 2, 1997) was an American catcher in Major League Baseball who played from 1936 to 1946. In between his playing years, from 1944 to 1945, he served in the United States Marine Corps during World War II. Born in Hedley, Texas, he died at age 83 in Williston, North Dakota.

References

External links

1914 births
1997 deaths
American expatriate baseball players in Canada
Baseball players from Texas
Brooklyn Dodgers players
Cincinnati Reds players
Major League Baseball catchers
Minor league baseball managers
Philadelphia Phillies players
People from Williston, North Dakota
United States Marine Corps personnel of World War II